The California Rodeo Salinas Hall of Fame is a cowboy hall of fame. Established in 2010 by the California Rodeo Salinas, the hall of fame recognizes and awards those individuals who helped build the rodeo and those rodeo performers who helped the rodeo become one of the top 20 professional rodeos in the United States as well as the top rodeo in California. The hall of fame divides the inductees into categories: Committee Members, Performers, Livestock, Contestants, Notables, Supporters/Contributors & Staff.

Hall of fame members by category

Notables 

 Lolla Galli 2010
 John W. Jones Family 2011
 Jim Rodriguez Sr. 2010
 Marguerite & Marvin Roberts 2013
 Julius G. Trescony 2016

Contract Personnel/Performer 

 Joe Baumgartner 2021
 Frank V. Borba 2018
 Bob & Nancy Cook 2013
 Mel Lambert 2011
 Abe Lefton 2010
 Wilbur Plaugher 2012

Contestants 

 Leo & Jerold Camarillo 2011
 Clay Carr 2016
 John Hawkins 2015
 Perry Ivory 2016
 Bill Martinelli 2021
 Harley May 2015
 David Motes 2012
 Ty Murray 2013
 Gene Rambo 2010
 Jack Roddy 2010
 Jim Rodriguez Jr. 2010
 The Santos Family 2014
 Frankie Schneider 2012
 Johnie Schneider 2012
 Rob Smets 2014
 Casey Tibbs 2018
 Harry Tompkins 2018
 J.C. Trujillo 2018

Track Contestants
 Johnny Brazil 2011
 Harry Rose Sr. 2015
 Greg Ward 2010

Committee Members 

 Chet Behen 2011
 Walt Cameron 2016
 F.E. 'Gene' Dayton 2011
 Doc Etienne 2010
 Albert Hansen, Jr. 2014
 Homer Hayward 2015
 Arthur Hebbron 2010
 EJ "Doc" Leach 2013
 Pete Pedrazzi 2012
 George Richardson 2013
 Ki Silacci 2010
 J. Michael 'Mike' Storm 2016
 Allan Wallace 2018
 Warren Wayland 2012

Supporters & Contributors 

 Barbara Balentine 2021
 Garcia Saddlery 2014
 Patricia Adcock Garlinger 2010
 The Happy Family 2011
 The US Army 2014

Livestock 

 Lucky Blanton 2011
 RR Le Mistral aka Mister 2012
 #16 Oscar 2013

References

External links 
 Official Website

2010 establishments in California
Cowboy halls of fame
Halls of fame in California
Sports halls of fame
Sports hall of fame inductees
Awards established in 2010
Museums established in 2010
Lists of sports awards